Richard Thomas Shannon (10 June 1931 – 19 February 2022) was an historian best known for his two-volume biography of William Ewart Gladstone. He was appointed Professor of Modern History at the University College Swansea, University of Wales in 1979.

He was born in Fiji, acquired his first degree at the University of Auckland, New Zealand, and a PhD at Gonville and Caius College, Cambridge. He taught modern history at Auckland and then at the University of East Anglia before moving to Swansea.

He died on 19 February 2022 at the age of 90.

Works
 with George Sidney Roberts Kitson Clark. Gladstone and the Bulgarian agitation 1876 (London: Nelson, 1963).

The Crisis of Imperialism, 1865-1915 (London: Hart-Davis McGibbon, 1974).
Gladstone: Peel's Inheritor, 1809-1865 (London: Hamish Hamilton, 1982).
The Age of Disraeli, 1868-1881: The Rise of Tory Democracy (London: Longman, 1992)
 "The Blind Victorian: Henry Fawcett and British Liberalism." English Historical Review 108.426 (1993): 239–241.
The Age of Salisbury, 1881-1902: Unionism and Empire (London: Longman, 1996).
Gladstone: Heroic Minister 1865 - 1898 (London: Allen Lane, 1999).
 "Peel, Gladstone and Party." Parliamentary History 18.3 (1999): 317-52
Gladstone: God and Politics (London: Hambledon Continuum, 2007).

Notes

1931 births
2022 deaths
20th-century New Zealand historians
University of Auckland alumni
Alumni of Gonville and Caius College, Cambridge
Academic staff of the University of Auckland
Academics of the University of East Anglia
Academics of Swansea University
21st-century New Zealand historians